84 Street is a short arterial road in east-central Edmonton, Alberta, Canada. It connects Rowland Road with 98 & 101 Avenues outside of downtown.

Neighbourhoods
List of neighbourhoods 84 Street runs through, in order from south to north. 
Holyrood
Cloverdale
Forest Heights

Interchanges and intersections
This is a list of major intersections, starting at the south end of 84 Street.

References

Roads in Edmonton